The IJ (sometimes shown on old maps as Y or Ye) is a body of water,  formerly a bay, in the Dutch province of North Holland. It is known for being Amsterdam's waterfront.

Etymology
The name IJ is derived from the West Frisian word ie, alternatively spelled ije, meaning water and cognate with the English word ea. The name consists of the digraph ij which is capitalized as IJ.

Geography

Today, the IJ is divided into two parts: 
 To the west of the Oranjesluizen (Oranje Locks), the Binnen-IJ (inner IJ), or Afgesloten-IJ (closed IJ), is directly connected to the North Sea Canal, where the port of IJmuiden and the North Sea can be reached.
 To the east of the Oranjesluizen, the Buiten-IJ (outer IJ) is an extension of the IJmeer which is itself an extension of the Markermeer.
The IJ is connected to the North Sea to the west and the IJmeer to the east by a set of locks.

History

There are several theories about the origins of the IJ. Perhaps it began as a stream, following a breakthrough in the dunes of Castricum.
More likely, the IJ is a remnant of a northern arm of the Rhine delta.
Finally, the IJ could also come from the lake Almere or Flevo.
During the Roman period the IJ connected on one side with lake Flevo and the Vecht (Utrecht) and the other with the North Sea. Connection with the North Sea has subsequently disappeared, while the IJ in the Middle Ages has expanded. This is due to the emergence of the Zuiderzee, itself a bay of the North Sea resulting from a number of storms.

At the end of the Middle Ages, the IJ was a long and narrow brackish bay that connected to the Zuiderzee and stretched from Amsterdam in the east to Velsen in the west.  At its west end, only the natural dune ridge across the Dutch North Sea coast prevented the IJ, which grew ever larger through the centuries, from directly connecting to the North Sea and so making the North Holland peninsula nearly an island. By the seventeenth century, however, access to the IJ became difficult due to sand bars across its mouth, and ships becoming bigger, and it was nearly impossible for seafaring vessels to reach the city of Amsterdam.  At the same time, the bay gnawed away at the surrounding farmlands, almost connecting with the Haarlemmermeer (Lake Haarlem) and seriously threatening the cities of Haarlem and Amsterdam.

Plans were put forth to reclaim both the Haarlemmermeer and the IJ and turn them into polders.  The Haarlemmermeer was first, falling dry in 1852, and the largest part of the IJ followed suit between 1865 and 1876, with only a small lake remaining at Amsterdam that was closed off from the Zuiderzee by the Oranje locks.  At the same time, the North Sea Canal was constructed in the former IJ basin to provide Amsterdam with access to the sea again and revive its ailing port.  It cut through the isthmus to connect to the North Sea near the town of Velsen; a new port, IJmuiden ("IJ's mouth") was built at its west end.  The east end of the IJ polders near Amsterdam was given over to industry, and a large new seaport area was constructed.

The Buiten-IJ hosted the mixed dinghy sailing events for the 1928 Summer Olympics in neighboring Amsterdam. It also hosted two events for the 1920 Summer Olympics in Antwerp.

The nautical event SAIL Amsterdam takes place on and around the IJ.

References

External links
 

Former bays
Geography of Amsterdam
Lakes of the Netherlands
Landforms of North Holland
Olympic sailing venues
Venues of the 1920 Summer Olympics
Venues of the 1928 Summer Olympics